St Werburgh's Road is a tram stop on the South Manchester Line (SML) and Airport Line of Greater Manchester's light-rail Metrolink system in Chorlton-cum-Hardy, Manchester. It was built as part of Phase 3a of the network's expansion and opened on 7 July 2011.

Consisting of an island platform to the east of St Werburgh's Road, the stop is built largely on the site of the former Chorlton Junction Signal Box and its surroundings.

History
St Werburgh's Road stop is on a re-opened railway line, the Cheshire Lines Committee line, which closed to passenger service in 1967. It was planned to reopen the line as part of the expansion of the Manchester Metrolink tram network. Proposals to re-open the line have been put forward since the 1980s, but remained unfunded until the 2000s. The line extension which was originally proposed would take over the disused trackbed of the Cheshire Lines Committee as far as East Didsbury.

In 2006, it was announced that the first phase of the "Big Bang" Metrolink expansion project (Phase 3A) would go ahead, including extending the network as far as St Werburgh's Road. Following the rejection of the Greater Manchester Transport Innovation Fund in a public referendum in 2008, extension of the line to East Didsbury (Phase 3B) went ahead with funding from national and local government.

Construction of the line began in April 2009 and the line became operational as far as St Werburgh's Road in July 2011. Services  to East Didsbury became operational on 23 May 2013.

On 3 November 2014, the Metrolink extension was opened from St Werburgh's Road station to Manchester Airport station.

In July 2015, a tram derailed at the stop after vandals attacked the tram and the tracks. In July 2016, a man was badly injured at the stop when his leg became trapped between a tram and the platform.

Service pattern 

Connecting bus routes
St Werburgh's Road station is served by the 84A bus route, running from Davyhulme to Merseybank via Urmston, Stretford and Chorlton. There are several services that stop in nearby Chorlton centre.

Fallowfield Loop path
The Fallowfield Loop shared use path begins at St Werburgh's Road station. It cuts away from the tram line in an easterly direction and follows the trackbed of the former Fallowfield Loop railway line through Fallowfield and Levenshulme to Fairfield and Gorton.

Gallery

References

External links

 Metrolink stop information
 St Werburgh's Road area map
Manchester Metrolink Extension Project -  map of the plans (Urban Transport Technology)
 https://web.archive.org/web/20130226053951/http://www.lrta.org/Manchester/city_south.html

Tram stops in Manchester
Manchester South District Line
Railway stations in Great Britain opened in 2011
Tram stops on the East Didsbury to Rochdale line
2011 establishments in England